RMS Otranto was an ocean liner that was built for the Orient Steam Navigation Company in 1925. The "RMS" prefix stands for Royal Mail Ship, as she carried overseas mail under a contract between Orient Line and Royal Mail. Otranto was in service until 1957, when she was sold for scrap.

The ship was named after the town of Otranto in Apulia in southern Italy. She was Orient Line's second ship of that name. The first was a 1909 passenger liner that in 1914 became the armed merchant cruiser  and in 1918 was lost as a result of a collision.

In the Second World War the second Otranto was converted into a troop ship and a Landing ship, infantry. She took part in the invasions of French North Africa (Operation Torch), Sicily (Operation Husky) and Italy (Operation Avalanche).

Building and details
Vickers Armstrong built Otranto in its Barrow-in-Furness shipyard and launched her on 9 July 1925.

She had twin propellers driven through reduction gears by six steam turbines that between them developed 3,722 NHP. Six double-ended and two single-ended boilers supplied steam at 215 lbf/in2 to the turbines. 56 corrugated furnaces with a combined grate surface area of  heated her boilers.

Career

In 1926 Otranto was slightly damaged when she struck a rock at Cape Grosso, Greece during a heavy rainstorm. Otranto accidentally collided with the Japanese steamer  in August 1928, heavily damaging her. In May 1932 she played a small part in the rescue of the passengers and crew of the French ocean liner  in the Gulf of Aden. On 4 August 1932 she collided with the Thames barge Why Not in the Thames Estuary at Thameshaven, Essex, England; Why Not sank.

When World War II broke out in 1939 the Admiralty requisitioned Otranto and had her converted into a troop ship. In 1942 she was modified to carry landing craft as a Landing ship, infantry. She took part in the invasion of French North Africa later that year and the landings in Sicily and Salerno in 1943. She was subsequently reconverted back into a troop transport and served as such until released from government service in 1948.

Otranto then resumed her pre-war role as a passenger liner, now refitted to carry 1,412 tourist-class passengers. In February 1957 she made her final voyage, from the UK to Sydney, Australia via Cape Town, South Africa. She was sold for scrap in June.

Notes

Bibliography
 
 
 

 

Ships built in Barrow-in-Furness
Troop ships of the Royal Navy
1925 ships
Passenger ships of the United Kingdom
Maritime incidents in 1926
Maritime incidents in 1928
Maritime incidents in 1932